Notte is a river of Brandenburg, Germany. It flows into the Dahme in Königs Wusterhausen.

See also
List of rivers of Brandenburg

Rivers of Brandenburg
Federal waterways in Germany
Rivers of Germany